The Associação Académica de Coimbra (AAC) is the students' union of the University of Coimbra (UC). Founded in Coimbra on November 3, 1887, it is the oldest students' union in Portugal. It is also the biggest Portuguese students' union belonging to an independent institution, since it represents all the students of its university, who gain automatic membership into the AAC as students of the University of Coimbra (25,580 students as of 2021).

In addition to several departments dedicated to culture and student life, ranging from theatre and musical groups to radio and cinematography, the AAC has several sports' departments based in Coimbra. All teams and athletes of the AAC sports departments bear the same name and logo with black uniforms. This is one of the largest sports clubs of Portugal. The Associação Académica de Coimbra - O.A.F. is one of its better known organizations across Portugal due to a historical presence on the main Portuguese Football Championships and the popularity of football in the country. In rugby (Portuguese Rugby Union Championship), volleyball (Portuguese Volleyball Championship) and basketball (Portuguese Basketball League (LCB)) top flight competitions, through the Associação Académica de Coimbra (rugby union), the Associação Académica de Coimbra (volleyball) and the Associação Académica de Coimbra (basketball) departments, the AAC has also been represented at the highest level in the Portuguese major competitions across its history, as well as in several olympic sports ranging from athletics to martial arts disciplines. The chess team has been Portuguese champion on several occasions.

History
The Associação Académica de Coimbra was predated by several older student organisations, for example the Orfeon Académico de Coimbra (1880). This choir remains as an autonomous entity within the association. The Associação Académica was founded on the base of the student dramatic society, the Academia Dramática de Coimbra (1849-1887). The main mover was a law student António Luís Gomes. In 1971, student protests against policies of the Estado Novo regime led to the Associação Académica being closed down, preceding a round of repression.

Organization

The AAC is governed by a "D.G. - Direcção Geral" (Directorate-General, the main board) made up entirely of students of the University of Coimbra; yearly elections take place to name the members of this board, any student can sign up to be a candidate. All the students of UC are entitled to vote for the AAC board. The current president of the main board is João Assunção.

Since the late 1990s inside the AAC structure have been created several local student unions, representing courses, departments or sometimes faculties/colleges. Known as “Núcleos” (Portuguese for nucleus), these semi-independent unions have their own elected internal organs. All of them represent a major role in the AAC political, cultural, sportive and social life. In 2008 the AAC comprehended 25 of such unions, of which NEFLUC (Students union of the Faculty of Letters) is the biggest, representing nearly 3000 students.

The main building of the Coimbra's Academic Association was inaugurated in 1961 and holds the offices of many sports clubs (secções desportivas) and arts sections (secções culturais). There are also rehearsal halls, a medical centre, academic services, extensive indoor gardens, a theatre-cinema with approximately 1,000 seats (Teatro Académico de Gil Vicente), and a café–restaurant where many students meet up and enjoy a wide selection of foods. AAC is the umbrella organization for a number of autonomous entities, the organismos autónomos.

Some of its better known former members include Salgado Zenha, Manuel Alegre, António de Almeida Santos, Miguel Torga, António Nobre, Vergílio Ferreira, Zeca Afonso, and Adriano Correia de Oliveira.

In addition, the AAC is the organizing and regulating body of the typical student Praxe (Praxis) of the University of Coimbra (UC), a rich tradition of rituals and festivities organized by UC's students, for the students.

Sports sections

Many sports teams and athletes of the AAC sports clubs have been regularly involved with major national and international sports clubs and competitions. The AAC sports clubs hold many of their training sessions and games in the University Stadium and Sports Complex of the University of Coimbra located in the Santa Clara area of the city, in the southern bank of the Mondego river. There is also the historical Campo de Santa Cruz close by the Pólo I campus of the University of Coimbra, the oldest campus of this university, which as facilities that include 2 fields for the practice of several sports events including football, rugby and baseball.

The AAC sports clubs include:

Archery
Athletics
Badminton
Baseball since 1994.
Basketball: is played at Pavilhão Multiusos de Coimbra. The team (Associação Académica de Coimbra - basketball) currently plays in the highest level of Portuguese basketball, the Portuguese Basketball Premier League.
Body building
Boxing
Canoeing
Chess
Competitive swimming 
Fencing
Football: Associação Académica de Coimbra - Secção de Futebol
Gymnastics
Handball
Judo
Karate
Motorized sports
Nautical sports
Radio-controlled car
Rink hockey
Associação Académica de Coimbra (rugby union): The team has been a major contender in the Portuguese top level rugby union championship. They represented Portugal once at the European Challenge Cup, as an amateur side, for the season of 2004/05, being eliminated by Borders, from Scotland, after heavy losses of 3-98, home, and 3-107, away, in an aggregate of 6-205. Académica didn't attend the European Shield the same season. The Coimbra side had one of its players, Rui Cordeiro, in the Portugal national rugby union team which was present at the 2007 Rugby World Cup.
Roller skating
Sport fishing
Taekwondo
Tennis
Volleyball: The team currently plays in the Portuguese Volleyball League A1.
Weightlifting
Wrestling

Arts sections
Among the Arts sections of the AAC, the Coimbra's University radio station is best known for its unique profile, youthful and refreshing attitude and avant-garde style. All the cultural sections of AAC are open to the entire society, promoting respected events, workshops and courses, both for students and the city community.

AAC cultural sections include:

Astronomy
Cinematography: 
Ecological Group: Founded in 1974, it is a place for debate, divulgation and intervention on ecological manners.
Fado de Coimbra music
Gastronomy
Human rights
Informatics
Journalism: A Cabra (university newspaper)
Philately
Portuguese language and culture divulgation
Radio: Rádio Universidade de Coimbra
Student SOS - Phone line to support and help students with any kind of personal problems
Television: TV-AAC
Writing and Reading
Yoga

Autonomous organisations

Besides the sports clubs and the arts sections of the Associação Académica de Coimbra, there are also independent organisations within the AAC, the Organismos Autónomos. Such as the above-mentioned Orfeon Académico de Coimbra (1880), which today represents the city of Coimbra and the university during its world tours.

The same applies to the professional football team of the AAC, the Associação Académica de Coimbra – O.A.F. (not to be confused with the Associação Académica de Coimbra - Secção de Futebol devoted to amateur football), usually known as "Académica" or "Briosa", which has a legally-binding link to the student association AAC and its university, the University of Coimbra. This team is amongst the top Portuguese football leagues and was created in 1887. It is a professional football club, established by the AAC and also part of the AAC as an independent club. The AAC football club was the first ever winner of the Portuguese Football Cup, in 1939.

Among the autonomous organisations of AAC there are also some well reputed theatre groups with a vast curriculum of acclaimed performances and playing a critical part in the city's cultural life.
AAC autonomous organisations include:

Choral music: OAC - Orfeon Académico de Coimbra and CMUC - Coro Misto da Universidade de Coimbra
Folk music and Ethnography: Grupo de Etnografia e Folclore da Academia de Coimbra
Professional football team: Associação Académica de Coimbra - O.A.F.
Music: Tuna Académica da Universidade de Coimbra
Plastic arts: Círculo de Artes Plásticas de Coimbra
Theatre: TEUC - Teatro dos Estudantes da Universidade de Coimbra and CITAC - Círculo de Iniciação Teatral da Academia de Coimbra

Events

The AAC is also responsible for the organization of the Queima das Fitas, one of the biggest student festivals in Europe and a great event in the city. The Festa das Latas, a smaller-scale event is the freshman's week of the University of Coimbra, also organised by the AAC. The AAC is the official body of the traditional Praxe, a sort of students' rite of passage, created by students of the University of Coimbra, which has a code of conduct, the Código da Praxe), a book published within the students' union.

The Symbol

Before the current logo, the AAC used to be represented by a black cape to reflect the university's traditional students' uniform. The AAC logo was created by Francisco Pimentel in 1927 by request of the AAC's Main board. The logo of the Associação Académica de Coimbra has a stylized drawing of the tower of the university and the acronym AAC.

The Tower of Coimbra's University is the city's «ex-libris» with its iconic bell. The tower's bell is known amongst the students as the cabra (she-goat). The tower is of Baroque style by the school of the German-born architect Ludovice who built it between 1728 and 1733. It is almost 34 metres high, and has a narrow and circular staircase which leads to a belvedere with remarkable views over the university, the historical part of the city centre and the river Mondego.

AAC uniqueness
University of Coimbra's AAC is the biggest organization of its kind in Europe. It is also the oldest in Portugal. AAC has a long history and unmatched reputation in student sports, cultural activities, and political activism. With a long history of struggle against unpopular state policies, forming notable politicians and intellectuals along the way, it also harbours a very dynamic associative life.

Other similar students' unions in the country, such as (Associação Académica da Universidade de Lisboa) (University of Lisbon),   Associação Académica da Universidade de Aveiro (University of Aveiro), Associação Académica da Universidade da Beira Interior (University of Beira Interior), Associação Académica da Universidade do Minho (Minho University), or Associação Académica da Universidade do Algarve (University of the Algarve), are smaller students' unions by number of associates because its universities have a smaller number of students or because the universities' student's aren't automatically members of the union, with a membership fee being required.

In other places in Portugal, there are many independent faculty, college, institute and school organizations of students from many mother-institutions (universities or polytechnical institutes) that are not representative of the whole mother-institution, being this fragmentation the reason for their smaller size, importance, and strength. There are also federations of students' unions comprising public and private, university and polytechnic independent and not related institutions from a city, like FAP - Federação Académica do Porto (from Porto) which is the largest students organization in the country, that do not represent a single university or polytechnic, but many independent federated students' unions from institutions of the most diverse kind.

See also
 University of Coimbra
 Associação Académica de Coimbra - O.A.F., football
 Associação Académica de Coimbra - basketball
 Associação Académica de Coimbra - volleyball
 Associação Académica de Coimbra (rugby union)
 Rádio Universidade de Coimbra (RUC)
And:
 Queima das Fitas, student festival in Portuguese universities
 Praxe, student initiation rituals in Portuguese universities
 Academic Crisis 1962, government clampdown on Portuguese universities
 Coimbra the town
 Coimbra Fado, the local version of the song genre

References

External links
Associação Académica de Coimbra (AAC) (in Portuguese)
Rádio Universidade de Coimbra (RUC) (in Portuguese)
Teatro dos Estudantes da Universidade de Coimbra (students theatre)
TV-AAC (television)
A Cabra (university students newspaper)
Universidade de Coimbra
  (Rink Hockey)

 
Student organizations established in 1887
University of Coimbra
Sport in Coimbra
University and college sports clubs in Portugal
Culture in Coimbra
Multi-sport clubs in Portugal
Students' unions in Portugal